I'm Not Dying Today is the first EP by American electronicore band Palisades. The EP was released on February 7, 2012.

Track listing

Personnel
Palisades
 Louis Miceli - lead vocals
 Xavier Adames - lead guitar, backing vocals
 Matthew Marshall - rhythm guitar
 Earl Halasan - turntables, synthesizer, lead/rhythm guitar
 Brandon Sidney - bass guitar, vocals
 Aaron Rosa - drums, percussion

Other personnel
 Tyler Smith (The Word Alive) - vocals on "Disclosure"

References
 

2012 EPs